La Cabaña Airport  is an airstrip serving the town of La Cabaña. It is located in the municipality of El Paisnal in San Salvador Department, El Salvador.

See also

Transport in El Salvador
List of airports in El Salvador

References

External links

 OpenStreetMap - La Cabaña
 HERE/Nokia - La Cabaña
 FallingRain - La Cabaña

Airports in El Salvador